Spiral Shadow is the fifth full-length album by American sludge metal band Kylesa, released by Season of Mist on October 25, 2010 in Europe and October 26, 2010 in the United States.

Reception

The album received positive reviews upon its release, and currently holds a metascore of 85 on Metacritic based on nine reviews, indicating "universal acclaim". It is also the highest rated metal album of the year according to the same site. Many critics praised the band's fusion of different genres, including sludge metal and psychedelic rock.

Accolades

Track listing

Personnel 
Phillip Cope – guitar, vocals
Laura Pleasants – guitar, vocals
Carl McGinley – drums, percussion
Tyler Newberry – drums, percussion
Corey Barhorst – bass, keyboards

Charts

References 

2010 albums
Kylesa albums